Melanopsis costata is a species of gastropods belonging to the family Melanopsidae.

The species is found in freshwater environments.

References

Melanopsidae